Dolforgan Hall is a large manor house near Kerry, Powys.

Early history 

A manor house was first built at Dolforgan in the 17th century, as the residence of the Fox family. In the middle of the 17th century the house was purchased by the Herbert family. Between 1790 and 1800, the house was extensively rebuilt and extended by John Herbert, essentially creating a new house. This new hall may have been designed by architect John Johnson. Some remains of the earlier building were left at the rear of the house.

Between 1807 and 1818, an iron bridge was built to carry the main drive to the house. This is one of the earliest iron bridges in the world.

Victorian era 
In 1846, Walter Long married 21-year-old Harriet Avarina Brunetta Herbert, the only daughter of Captain Owen Herbert, the owner of Dolforgan. Harriet died the following year as a result of complications during childbirth, and Walter died three months later, some say of a broken heart. Dolforgan passed to Walter's brother Richard Penruddocke Long in 1867.

Walton moved into the Hall in 1870, and it was his primary residence until his death in 1883. Walton was also a High Sheriff of Montgomeryshire.

In 1894, after Walton's death, Dolforgan was sold to John William Willans, the Chief Engineer of the Liverpool Overhead Railway. He died unexpectedly in 1895, and the estate passed to his son John Bancroft Willans.

Modern history 
John Bancroft Willans inherited the Hall and his father's significant wealth. he lived at Dolforgan until his death in 1957. J. B. Willans was a historian and photographer, and made an extensive photographic record of Dolforgan, which is now in the National Library of Wales.

After Willans' death, Dolforgan was bought by the Jones family, who still own it. The Hall is currently divided into five flats. It is a Grade II* listed building

Description 
The hall has a three-storey Regency style facade. The entrance has two full-height pilasters, and four columns holding up an ionic porch. There is a Gothic style sawmill on the grounds.

References

External links 
 Herbert Noel Jerman, who lived at Dolforgan

 
Grade II* listed buildings in Powys
Country houses in Powys